Events from the year 1999 in Kuwait.

Incumbents
Emir: Jaber Al-Ahmad Al-Jaber Al-Sabah
Prime Minister: Saad Al-Salim Al-Sabah

Events
 Kuwaiti Premier League 1998–99
 Kuwaiti Premier League 1999–2000

See also
Years in Jordan
Years in Syria

References

 
Kuwait
Kuwait
Years of the 20th century in Kuwait
1990s in Kuwait